Yeh Mera India (also named Y.M.I. Yeh Mera India ) is a 2008 Hindi movie, written and directed by N. Chandra. The film stars Anupam Kher, Perizaad Zorabian, Sayaji Shinde Purab Kohli, Rajpal Yadav, Sarika, and Seema Biswas.

Plot
Yeh Mera India focuses on the comprehensive lifestyle of Mumbai, with a special focus on the biases that permeate the corner of its society. Whether it is communal, social, economic, religious or educational biases, the "bias" factor dominates the entire depiction of the film, merging different characters into one story.

The different biases that are incorporated into the film are as following:

Religious bias - A devout Muslim listens to the radical sermons of a religious leader that aims to instigate his followers to take revenge for the wrongdoings occurring within the Islamic community. This leads his followers to collaborate to create havoc in the city, but plans fail. However, when the plan is about to succeed, the follower decides to abort it, seeing a Hindu boy walk towards it. This child had previously helped a lost Muslim girl find her mother.
Communal bias - Rajpal Yadav is a Bihari who has just arrived in Mumbai, looking for work. In his quest for some money and food, Yadav encounters incredible bias against his community, with Marathis blaming his creed for taking away jobs and others ridiculing his sub-par technical skills. On the other side, Shrivallabh Vyas a Brahmin politician opposes his son's courtship of Smilie Suri a Dalit girl; however, he decides to exploit the relationship for political gain.
Social bias - Sarika is the administrator of a large hospital, running it with zeal and fervor. Seema Biswas is a poor woman who is trying to gather funds for her husband's bail money, as he has been framed in a fraudulent case. Biswas works at Sarika's house, cooking meals and cleaning the house. Despite Seema's honest work, Sarika continues to doubt her when things go missing, checking her purse and doubting her character. In the end, it is Biswas who comes to the aid of Sarika at a crucial moment.
Gender bias - Sarika's husband is a successful builder and owner of several Call Centre across Mumbai. Intoxicated with money and power, he finds himself unable to resist deflowering women, using every moment to lure women, by showering expensive gifts on them. However, a moment arrives where he finds himself on crossroads, unable to face the reality, but understanding its repercussions.
Economic bias - Perizaad Zorabian is a successful creative head of a channel. However, work and life has tensed her. She is unable to bear the hectic pressure of Mumbai and asks her husband to find work in either the United States or United Kingdom. Perizaad looks for opportunities to insult people and finds her financial power too strong to succumb to emotion.

Biases of these sort weave the entire story into finding resolutions based on the biases of individuals and the reality of the lifestyle of Mumbai. The message clearly floated through movie is We have to learn to live together like Brothers or perish like Fools, as said by M. Luther King. This movie plot has certain similarities with the plot of Crash (2004), an American movie starring Matt Dillon, Sandra Bullock, Don Cheadle, Thandie Newton and Brendan Fraser.

Cast

Reception
Yeh Mera India received mixed reviews from critics. Rajeev Masand said in his review that "the acting's embarrassingly weak and the scenarios all exaggerated", but Taran Adarsh wrote, "Here's a film that pricks your conscience and makes you think".  It also failed to do well at the box office.

Soundtrack
"Aap Roothe Rahe" (Kavita Seth)
"Bansuri" (Zubeen Garg)
"Dil Mandir" (Kavita Seth)
"More Naina" (Kavita Seth)

References

External links
 

2008 films
2000s Hindi-language films
Films about the caste system in India
Films about women in India
Films about poverty in India
Films about religious violence in India
Films directed by N. Chandra
Hyperlink films